Jo Carol Phelan is a Special Research Scientist in the Department of Sociomedical Sciences and Co-Director of the Center for the Study of Social Inequalities and Health at Columbia University's Mailman School of Public Health. She is known for working with Bruce Link to develop the theory of fundamental causes of social inequalities in health. She was a Russell Sage Foundation Visiting Scholar from 2012 to 2013. She also received a Health Policy Investigator Award from the Robert Wood Johnson Foundation in 1996, and the 1999 book Handbook of the Sociology of Mental Health, which she co-edited, received the prize for best publication from the American Sociological Association's Section of the Sociology of Mental Health.

References

External links

Living people
American sociologists
American women social scientists
American women sociologists
University of California alumni
Stony Brook University alumni
Columbia University Mailman School of Public Health faculty
Year of birth missing (living people)
21st-century American women